Karel Vácha (born 2 August 1970) is a Czech former football player, who played most notably for České Budějovice and Slavia Prague. He made 237 appearances in the Gambrinus liga and its predecessor, scoring 74 goals. He scored four goals in the 1997–98 UEFA Cup Winners' Cup with Slavia. He made one appearance for the Czech Republic, playing against the Faroe Islands on 6 September 1997.

Playing career
Vácha was captain of the Budějovice side.

In 2003, he moved to Slovak club Artmedia Petržalka, where he scored twice on his debut in a 3–0 win against Košice.

Later career
Vácha was appointed assistant coach to manager František Straka at České Budějovice in 2007.

References

External links
 

Czech footballers
Czech Republic international footballers
1970 births
Living people
Sportspeople from České Budějovice
Czech First League players
SK Slavia Prague players
SK Dynamo České Budějovice players
Austrian Football Bundesliga players
Slovak Super Liga players
FC Petržalka players
Association football forwards
FC Tirol Innsbruck players
Czechoslovak footballers
Czech expatriate sportspeople in Slovakia
Czech expatriate footballers
Expatriate footballers in Slovakia
Czech expatriate sportspeople in Austria
Expatriate footballers in Austria